Jorien ter Mors (born 21 December 1989) is a retired Dutch speed skater on both short track and long track. She was the Olympic champion in the 1500 metres and team pursuit (long track) at the 2014 Winter Olympics and the 1000 metres at the 2018 Winter Olympics.

Short track
Ter Mors competed at the 2010 Winter Olympics for the Netherlands. She placed third in her round one race of the 500 metres and was disqualified in the opening round of the 1000 metres, failing to advance. She was also a member of the Dutch 3000 metre relay team, which finished third in the semifinals and won the B Final, ending up fourth overall.  Her best overall individual finish, is 23rd, in the 500 metres.

As of 2013, ter Mors has won two silver medals at the World Championships; the first came in 2011, as a member of the Dutch relay team, and the second in 2013 in the 1000 metres. She has also won three gold medals as a member of the Dutch relay team at the European Championships.

As of 2013, ter Mors has one ISU Short Track Speed Skating World Cup victory, coming as part of the Dutch relay team in 2012–13 at Dresden. She also has four other podium finishes. Her top World Cup ranking is 7th, in the 1500 metres in 2013–14.

On 13 February 2014, she skated the B-finals in the 500 metres and placed sixth in the overall standings. On 15 February 2014 she became fourth at the 1,500 metres during the 2014 Winter Olympics.

On 20 February 2018, she skated the B-finals in the 3,000 metres relay at the 2018 Winter Olympics and her team set the world record time of 4:03.471. Incredibly, their effort for that record was rewarded with a bronze medal because in the A-finals Canada and China both were penalized and disqualified leaving only two A-finals teams to get gold and silver. The Netherlands received a bronze medal even though they didn't skate in the A-finals. This was her first ever medal in short-track speed skating at the Olympics. Ter Mors became the first female athlete to win Olympic medals in two different sports at the same Winter Olympic Games.

Long track
In 2012, ter Mors started competing in long track speed skating events. After winning the 2013 KNSB Dutch Allround Championships and the 1,500m at the 2014 KNSB Dutch Single Distance Championships she went back to short track, but in the 2013–14 World Cup 4 in Berlin she was part of the Dutch team that won a gold medal in the team pursuit.

At the Dutch Olympic trials, held on 26 –30 December 2013 in Thialf, Heerenveen, she participated in the 1,000, 1,500 and 3,000m but only qualified for the 1,500m where she finished in third place behind Ireen Wüst and Lotte van Beek. On 16 February 2014 she won the Olympic Gold medal at the 1,500 metres during the 2014 Winter Olympics. She set a new Olympic record while doing so, with a time of 1:53.51, the second fastest time at sea level.

At the 2018 World Sprint Speed Skating Championships, ter Mors won her first world sprint championship gold medal. She previously won bronze in the 2016 and 2017 world sprint championships.

World Cup podiums

Short track

Long track

Personal records

Long track

She has a score of 158.276 in the adelskalender.

Tournament overview–long track

source:

References

External links

 
 
 
 

1989 births
Living people
Dutch female speed skaters
Dutch female short track speed skaters
Olympic speed skaters of the Netherlands
Olympic short track speed skaters of the Netherlands
Olympic gold medalists for the Netherlands
Olympic bronze medalists for the Netherlands
Olympic medalists in speed skating
Olympic medalists in short track speed skating
Speed skaters at the 2014 Winter Olympics
Speed skaters at the 2018 Winter Olympics
Short track speed skaters at the 2010 Winter Olympics
Short track speed skaters at the 2014 Winter Olympics
Short track speed skaters at the 2018 Winter Olympics
Medalists at the 2014 Winter Olympics
Medalists at the 2018 Winter Olympics
Sportspeople from Enschede
World Single Distances Speed Skating Championships medalists
World Sprint Speed Skating Championships medalists
World Short Track Speed Skating Championships medalists
21st-century Dutch women